Petrochimi Bandar Imam Basketball Club (Tim-e Beskâtbal-e Petrushimi-ye Bendâr Eman), also known as shortly Petrochimi, is an Iranian professional basketball club based in Mahshahr, Iran. They compete in the Iranian Basketball Super League. In 2012 they became the first club in Iran to establish a basketball youth academy.

History
In 2013, under the guidance of Doctor Mehran Hatami, Petro won the Iranian Basketball Super League for the first time in their history after defeating Mahram Tehran in the final. In 2014, Petro went undefeated throughout the season and again faced Mahram Tehran in the final and again won the league. After signing former NBA player Hamed Haddadi in 2016, Petrochimi won its fourth league title after defeating Naft Abadan in the final. In the same year, Petro finished in third place in the 2016 FIBA Asia Champions Cup.

In 2018, Petrochimi won the FIBA Asia Champions Cup and was crowned champions of Asia. The team beat Alvark Tokyo 68–64 in the final, behind 28 points by Meisam Mirzaei.

Honours

Domestic competitions
Iranian Super League
Champions (4): 2012–13, 2013–14, 2015–16, 2016–17

International competitions
FIBA Asia Champions Cup
Champions (1): 2018
Third place (1): 2016
WABA Champions Cup
Winners (2): 2016, 2018
Runners-up (3): 2014, 2017, 2019

Roster

Notable former players

References

External links
Fan website
page on Asia-Basket

Basketball teams in Iran
Sport in Khuzestan Province
Basketball teams established in 2002